Dabak Daba Aisa is a Tulu language comedy film written and directed by Prakash Pandeshwar, Starring Devadas Kapikad, Naveen D. Padil, Bhojaraj Vamanjoor in lead roles. The movie has been produced by Prakash Pandeshwar under the banner of Jayakirana Films.

Cast 
 Devadas Kapikad as Jeevan Jeeth Bus driver Devu
 Naveen D. Padil as Jeevan Jeeth bus conductor Naveen
 Bhojaraj Vamanjoor
 Aravind Bolar
 Sundar Rai Mandara
 Umesh Kotian Mijar
Munju Rai
Vinay Bhat 
Brijesh Garodi
Dithesh Poojary
Jaganaath Shetty Bala
M Narayanan Nambiar

Soundtrack 
Song List

References